Kundi Paihama (9 December 1944 – 24 July 2020) was an Angolan politician who served as Angola's Minister of Defense from 2002 to 2010. He served subsequently as Minister for War Veterans.

Paihama was the 18th candidate on the national list of the People's Movement for the Liberation of Angola (MPLA) in the September 2008 parliamentary election. He won a seat in this election, in which the MPLA won an overwhelming majority in the National Assembly.

Kundi Paihama owned 33.15% of the shares of the Banco Angolano de Negócios e Comércio.

Paihama died in a private hospital in Luanda.

Paihama was sometimes a controversial figure in Angola's ruling party, the MPLA with a few famous quotes including: "Não percam tempo a escutar as mensagens de promessas de certos políticos, trabalhem para ser ricos" (do not waste your time listening to the promises of certain politicians, work hard and get rich" and “Durmo bem, como bem e o que restar no meu prato dou aos meus cães e não aos pobres” (I sleep and eat well, my leftovers go to my dogs, not the destitute).

References

External links
 Perfil do Ministro do MACVP
 Sintese biografica – Short biography

Angolan military personnel
Members of the National Assembly (Angola)
Defence ministers of Angola
State Security ministers of Angola
Governors of Benguela
Governors of Cunene
Governors of Huambo
Governors of Huíla
Governors of Luanda
MPLA politicians
People from Huíla Province
1944 births
2020 deaths